Acteon vangoethemi is a species of sea snail, a marine gastropod mollusk in the family Acteonidae.

Original description
   Poppe G.T., Tagaro S.P. & Stahlschmidt P. (2015). New shelled molluscan species from the central Philippines I. Visaya. 4(3): 15-59. page(s): 34, pl. 13 figs 5-6.

References

Acteonidae
Gastropods described in 2015